Ľubomír Willwéber (born 11 September 1992) is a Slovak footballer who currently plays for Dukla Banská Bystrica as a midfielder.

References

External links
 FK Dukla Banská Bystrica profile
 Eurofotbal profile
 
 Futbalnet profile

1992 births
Living people
Slovak footballers
Association football midfielders
FK Dukla Banská Bystrica players
FK Frýdek-Místek players
Slovak Super Liga players
2. Liga (Slovakia) players
Expatriate footballers in the Czech Republic